Lucas Lepri (born September 19, 1984) is a Brazilian jiu-jitsu black belt practitioner.

A 9-time black belt World Champion Lepri in all belts, Lepri has won every major jiu-jitsu tournament at black belt including the World Jiu-Jitsu Championship (Gi and No-Gi), Pan American Championship (Gi and No-Gi), European Championship and the Brazilian National Jiu-Jitsu Championship. Lepri is a member of the IBJJF Hall of Fame.

Career 
Lucas Alves Lepri was born on September 19, 1985 in the state of Minas Gerais, Brazil. Lepri earned his black belt at the end of 2006 under Elan Santiago. After Santiago closed his academy Lepri moved to Top Team academy under Fernando Terere, after that academy also closed Lepri then joined Santiago at the Alliance team. In 2008 he moved to the US after being invited to coach at Alliance New York Academy.

He is currently based in Charlotte, North Carolina.

Instructor lineage 
Carlos Gracie > Carlson Gracie> Sergio Bolão > Mauro Chueng > Elan Santiago > Lucas Lepri

References

Living people
1984 births
Brazilian practitioners of Brazilian jiu-jitsu
Sportspeople from Minas Gerais
People awarded a black belt in Brazilian jiu-jitsu
World Brazilian Jiu-Jitsu Championship medalists
World No-Gi Brazilian Jiu-Jitsu Championship medalists